The Arará  people form an Afro-Cuban ethnoreligious group descended from the Dahomey kingdom of West Africa, and retaining an identity, religion, and culture separate from those of other Afro-Cuban peoples. Although, historically, the Arará people have been staunch defenders of their separate heritage and religion, this distinct identity - while it still persists - has, over time, become increasingly blurred and harder to maintain.

History

Origins
The Arará were originally enslaved as prisoners-of-war in the invasions of Dahomey by the Oyo Empire. Years after enslavement and transport to Cuba, Yoruba slaves descendant from the Oyo Empire began to arrive in Cuba. Due to the pre-existing tensions in West Africa these two groups remained socially distant and developed separate cultures and identities. Despite close similarities in their religious practices both groups retained separate priesthoods. It was not until the early 1900s that Arará and Yoruba Cubans became sufficiently comfortable in each other's company to begin to mix culturally.

Evolution
Currently many Arará traditions have mixed with other Afro-Cuban traditions and retention of a solid Arará identity in heritage and things cultural has become difficult as over time various differing traditions and peoples have melded in a growing sense of Afro-Cuban cultural exchange, especially in religious practices.

Religion
Arará religion is a religion indigenous to Cuba. Its origins can be traced to the Ewe-Fon of Dahomey. Many gods known as "luases" are worshiped, similar to the Loa in Vodou, many of which are borrowed from Yoruba gods. Some minor Kongo based rituals are also practiced. Originally the religion had popularity in Matanzas and Santiago de Cuba.

Even though Vodou gods are venerated rather than Yoruba gods, Santeria practices and linguistics have merged into Arará practices. However, the music and dance of Arará ceremonies continues to be quite different from that of Santeria ceremonies, thus separating the two religions. It has been estimated that around the 1890s or the early 1900s Santeria and Arará religions began mixing, resulting in the Arará adoption of Santeria customs in guidance of ceremonies. Today many practitioners use Yoruba terminology to explain their practices but still continue to use unique ceremonial dances. Some of these dances are noted for their similarity to dances in Haitian Vodou because of both religion's shared heritage but the dances still remain different.

See also
Haitian Vodou drumming

References

Afro-Caribbean
Afro-Cuban
Afro–Puerto Rican
Beninese diaspora